George Henry Boehler (January 2, 1892 – June 23, 1958) was a  American baseball player.

Born in Lawrenceburg, Indiana, in 1892, he played professional baseball as a right-handed pitcher for 20 years from 1911 to 1930, including nine years in Major League Baseball with the Detroit Tigers (1912–1916), St. Louis Browns (1920–1921), Pittsburgh Pirates (1923), and Brooklyn Robins (1926). He appeared in 61 major league games and compiled a 6–12 win–loss record with 18 saves and a 4.71 earned run average (ERA).

Boehler also played for many years in the minor leagues, including seven season in which he won 20 or more games. His best season was 1922 when he compiled a 38–13 record in 62 games for the Tulsa Oilers in the Western League. He twice won 27 games—for the Newark Skeeters in 1912 and the St. Joseph Drummers in 1913.  He also won 88 games for the Oakland Oaks of the Pacific Coast League between 1924 and 1927.

Boehler died in 1958 at age 66 in Lawrenceburg, Indiana.  He was buried at Greendale Cemetery in Greendale, Indiana.

References

Brooklyn Robins players
Detroit Tigers players
Major League Baseball pitchers
Baseball players from Indiana
People from Lawrenceburg, Indiana
Pittsburgh Pirates players
St. Louis Browns players
1892 births
1958 deaths
Springfield Reapers players
Newark Newks players
St. Joseph Drummers players
Syracuse Stars (minor league baseball) players
Denver Bears players
Joplin Miners players
Tulsa Oilers (baseball) players
Omaha Buffaloes players
Oakland Oaks (baseball) players
Los Angeles Angels (minor league) players
Nashville Vols players
Sportspeople from the Cincinnati metropolitan area